Homoanarta falcata is a moth of the family Noctuidae. It is found in North America, including Texas, Utah and Arizona.

External links
Images

Cuculliinae